South Dakota's 3rd congressional district is an obsolete United States congressional district.  It was created after the 1910 census and abolished after the 1930 census. The district covered all of the counties in South Dakota west of the Missouri River.

List of members representing the district

References

 Congressional Biographical Directory of the United States 1774–present

03
Former congressional districts of the United States
Constituencies established in 1913
1913 establishments in South Dakota
Constituencies disestablished in 1933
1933 disestablishments in South Dakota

pl:Trzeci okręg wyborczy w Dakocie Południowej